Arthur Günsburg (February 18, 1872 - ?) was a film director, producer, and film company executive (A. G. Films) from Vienna, Austria who worked in Germany. He made the first feature film about Rembrandt.

Filmography
Die Tragödie eines Großen (The Tragedy of a Great Man), a silent historical film about Rembrandt
Der Vaukler Von Paris (The Juggler of Paris) (1922)
The Mute of Portici (1922 film) (German: Die Stumme von Portici) based on Daniel Auber's opera La muette de Portici
Ballettratten (1925)
Die glühende Gasse (1927), directed by Paul Sugar, produced by Arthur Günsburg from the novel by Paul Rosenhayn

References

Film people from Vienna
Austrian film directors
1872 births
1933 deaths